Lilla Namo, artist name for Namo Marouf (born 25 September 1988) is a Swedish rapper.

In the summer of 2012, Lilla Namo released her first music single called Haffa Guzz. She has earlier co-operated with singers like Maskinen, Mack Beats, Mohammed Ali and Marcus Price. In 2012 she was also nominated in the category of hiphop/soul in that years P3 Guld-awards. In 2013 she sang in the rapper Petter's song "King" from the album Början på allt, an in 2015 she appeared in the song Vandrar from Petters album Mitt folk.

In 2013 her debut album was released called Tuggare utan gränser.

References

External links

Living people
1988 births
Swedish-language singers